Christian Michel Armas Curiel (born January 13, 1986, in Tepic) is a former Mexican professional football defender who last played for Peñarol La Mesilla in the Liga Nacional de Guatemala.

References
 
 

1986 births
Living people
Sportspeople from Tepic, Nayarit
Footballers from Nayarit
Mexican footballers
Association football defenders
C.D. Guadalajara footballers
Chiapas F.C. footballers
Halcones FC players
Liga MX players
Mexican expatriate footballers
Expatriate footballers in Guatemala
Mexican expatriate sportspeople in Guatemala